Christ's Church, Mochou Road is a Protestant church located in Qinhuai District, Nanjing, Jiangsu, China.

History 
The church traces its origins to the former Oratory, founded by the Presbyterian Mission Agency in the 19th century. And the Church of Christ in China established the Hanzhong Church in 1927. Renovations and rebuilding to the main building began in 1936 and were completed in 1942.

The church was closed during the ten-year Cultural Revolution. It was officially reopened to the public in 1981. The church was classified as a municipal cultural relic preservation organ in 1992 and a provincial cultural relic preservation organ in 2002, respectively.

References

Further reading 
 

Churches in Nanjing
1942 establishments in China
Churches completed in 1942
Tourist attractions in Nanjing
Protestant churches in China